Laurel Grace Barker McAlister  (20 October 1892 – 25 February 1981) was a New Zealand welfare worker and community leader. She was born in Temuka, New Zealand, on 20 October 1892.

In the 1946 New Year Honours, McAlister was appointed a Member of the Order of the British Empire, in recognition of her service as a member of the Women's War Service Auxiliary. In 1977, she was awarded the Queen Elizabeth II Silver Jubilee Medal.

References

1892 births
1981 deaths
New Zealand social workers
People from Temuka
New Zealand Members of the Order of the British Empire